Somedays or Some Days may refer to:

"Somedays", a song by Audioslave from Revelations, 2006
"Somedays", a song by Paul McCartney from Flaming Pie, 1997
"Somedays", a song by the Raconteurs from Help Us Stranger, 2019
Some Days, an album by Dennis Lloyd, 2021

See also
 Someday (disambiguation)